"And We Danced" is a song by the American rock band the Hooters, released as the first single from their second album, Nervous Night. "And We Danced" was released in 1985 and became the band's first major hit, just missing the top 20 on the US Billboard Hot 100 chart (peaking at #21), but reaching #3 on the Mainstream Rock charts. It became the band's second consecutive Top 10 hit in Australia, reaching #6.

The band performed the song at the Live Aid benefit concert in Philadelphia, on July 13, 1985.

The music video for the song, featuring live footage of the band filmed at the now-demolished Exton Drive-In in Exton, Pennsylvania, in the summer of 1985, was nominated for the Best New Artist in a Video award at the 1986 MTV Video Music Awards. One of the members is shown playing a Hohner melodica (the "hooter" from whence the band got their name), a reed instrument played by mouth with keyboard notes which can be fingered to produce a harmonica-like sound.

Background
Singer Eric Bazilian said,

Reception
Cash Box said that the song shows the "band’s flair vocally and instrumentally" and has "an appealing Springsteen-like purely American sound."

Cover versions
Canadian duo Sons of Maxwell covered the song on their 1998 album The Neighbourhood. Their version was released as a single in 1999 and peaked at number 54 on the RPM Country Tracks chart.

Fellow Philadelphia artist Atom and His Package incorporated a cover of the chorus into the end of his 1997 song "Goalie" off the A Society of People Named Elihu album.

British/Australian folk duo The April Maze released a cover of the song on their 2012 album Two.

Accolades
"And We Danced" was ranked as the 88th greatest song of the 80's on internet radio station WDDF Radio's "The 88 Greatest Songs of the 80's" second annual Independence Day countdown in 2017.

Charts

Weekly charts

Year-end charts

References

1985 singles
Songs written by Rob Hyman
Songs written by Eric Bazilian
The Hooters songs
Sons of Maxwell songs
Song recordings produced by Rick Chertoff
1985 songs
Columbia Records singles
Songs about dancing
American power pop songs